Tirumala ghat roads are two asphalt steep natural slopes ghat roads between Tirupati and Tirumala. They are in Seshachalam Hills range in Pūrva Ghaṭ.

Route Descriptions 
Both ghat roads are double lane type, follow different paths along the hills.  The old ghat road was laid in 1944, other was opened in 1974. Old ghat road route is used for vehicles from Tirumala to Tirupati and new ghat road is from Tirupati to Tirumala. The starting point of the road to go up Tirumala hills is Alipiri and it is overlooked by an immense statue of Garuda in an anjili pose. Each road is approximately 19 km in length and has more than 36  hair pin bends. It takes 40 minutes to reach top Tirumala Venkateswara Temple.

Design
The planning and execution of the old ghat road, which winds for 12 miles over hills and dales through dense jungles and in one portion across a deep valley, 200 feet wide have been accomplished with much engineering skill and ability by Diwan Bagadur A. Nageswara Ayyar, special engineer in charge. 

Ref: The Hindu. Dated: April 11, 1944. 

Ref: The Hindu. Dated: May 16, 2006

Toll gate

At Alipiri, Tollgate cum security zone was established to screen vehicles and pilgrims entering Tirumala, to safeguard the hills from terrorists and anti-social elements.

See also 
Nilgiri Ghat Roads

References 

Tirupati
Tirupati district
Geography of Tirupati district
Scenic roads in India
Transport in Tirupati